Chamabad (also Romanized as Chamābād) is a village in Shurab-e Tangazi Rural District, in the Central District of Kuhrang County, Chaharmahal and Bakhtiari Province, Iran. At the 2006 census, its population was 11, in 6 families. The village is populated by Lurs.

References 

Populated places in Kuhrang County
Luri settlements in Chaharmahal and Bakhtiari Province